101 series may refer to:
 Seibu 101 series EMU
 101 series EMU, introduced in 1957 by Japanese National Railways